The 86th Indianapolis  race was held at the Indianapolis Motor Speedway in Speedway, Indiana on Sunday, May 26, 2002. It was the seventh Indianapolis 500 held as part of the Indy Racing League IndyCar Series schedule, and was part of the 2002 Indy Racing League season.

Rookie Tomas Scheckter led 85 laps, and appeared on his way to a possible victory, which would have marked the third consecutive Indy win for a first-year driver. However, Scheckter crashed while leading with only 27 laps to go. Hélio Castroneves, who also won the 2001 running became the fifth driver in Indy 500 history to win back-to-back races. It was his second of four Indy 500 victories. It is largely considered one of the most controversial races in Indy history.

On the 199th lap, second place Paul Tracy was alongside leader Hélio Castroneves, going for the lead in the third turn. At the same time, a crash occurred on another part of the track, bringing out the caution flag. Indy Racing League officials ruled that the yellow came out before Tracy completed the pass, and Castroneves was declared the victor. After an official protest was filed, and after an appeals hearing, Castroneves' victory was upheld on July 2, 2002.

About 7.46 inches of rain fell during the month of May, considerably interrupting the on-track activities. The second day of time trials was completely washed out, while Bump Day was cut short due to rain. Likewise, six of the ten practice days were either delayed by moisture or halted due to rain showers. Uncomfortably cold temperatures also were observed during most of the month. Private testing and rookie orientation in April was also hampered several times due to rain and cold temperatures. Race day, however, was sunny, warm, and clear.

Background
During the off-season, several CART teams again committed to entries in the IRL-sanctioned Indy 500 for 2002. Penske Racing, Chip Ganassi Racing, and Team Green all announced they would return from 2001. Rahal Letterman Racing also announced they would join the CART teams and cross party lines to race at Indy. Due to the MSA, Team Green announced that they would not have primary sponsor KOOL, but their cars would carry the colors of associate sponsor 7-Eleven.

Robby Gordon announced on March 28 that he would attempt "double duty" for 2002 by racing in the Indy 500 and Coca-Cola 600 on the same day. Tony Stewart, who attempted the feat in 1999 and 2001, announced he would not do so for 2002. John Andretti, who did so in 1994, also announced he would not attempt the double.

During the spring, the asphalt pavement at the Indianapolis Motor Speedway underwent a diamond grinding in an effort to smooth out several bumps. In April, the new SAFER barrier was retrofitted to the retaining walls in the turns at the Speedway. It marked the first installation of the revolutionary-new energy-absorbing technology at an American superspeedway.

Rule changes
For the 2002 race, all pit crew members that work over the wall must wear approved helmets. This requirement was in response to a succession of accidents and injuries (particularly head injuries) involving pit crew members in series sanctioned by members of ACCUS (NASCAR, IMSA, SCCA, NHRA, CART, IRL). Many pit crews in the series had already been utilizing helmets since about 1999, when Steve Fried, the crew chief for Robby McGehee was critically injured in a pit accident. The accident put Freid in a coma for several weeks.

Prior to 2002, it was only required that the crew member operating the fuel rig was to wear a helmet. It was to protect from fire in case of a fuel spill, and protect him in case he lost his balance. His position between the front and rear axles was deemed particularly precarious. The tire changers did not wear helmets, despite the fact that they were more exposed and vulnerable to injury from other cars entering and exiting the pit lane.

The standardized font car numbers (black numerals on a white box) used from 1999 to 2001 were scrapped. Teams were permitted to utilize any color/font for car numbers decals, provided they were sufficiently visible. Car number decal placement locations were also adjusted. The required car number locations were to be one on the nose, and one on each rear wing vertical panel (right & left).

Race schedule

Practice and time trials

Practice – week 1
On opening day, Robby McGehee became the first driver to crash into the newly installed SAFER barrier. Scott Sharp and Hélio Castroneves led the speed chart.

During the first week of practice, rain delayed the start of track activity on Monday, Tuesday, Wednesday, and Thursday.

Crashes involving P. J. Jones, Mark Dismore, Max Papis, and Alex Barron occurred during the first week. During practice on the morning of pole day, Paul Tracy suffered a major accident in turn 2, demolishing his lone car. Without a backup car, the team was forced to make repairs.

The top of the speed chart changed widely over each day, with no driver atop the leaderboard more than twice all  month. Speeds flirted with the  barrier for the first time since 1996. Bruno Junqueira finally cracked  around 3:30 p.m. on Friday May 10.

Pole Day time trials – Saturday May 11
Three days of time trials were scheduled for 2002. On pole day May 11, Bruno Junqueira was the first car to make a qualifying attempt. His speed held up all afternoon, and he secured his first Indy 500 pole position. He was also the first driver since Emerson Fittipaldi in 1990 to win the pole after qualifying as the coveted "first in the field." The front row was rounded out by IRL-regular Robbie Buhl, and Raul Boesel in the Team Menard car.

The second day of time trials, scheduled for May 12, was rained out. All remaining time trials were shifted to bump day, May 19.

Practice – week 2
During the second week of practice, three additional days were delayed or halted by rain. Paul Tracy returned to the track late in the week, in preparation to qualify on the second weekend.

Bump Day time trials – Sunday May 19
On bump day, nine spots remained open in the field. Rain delayed the start by over an hour, but several cars lined up to make attempts. The field filled to 33 cars just before 2 p.m., with Billy Roe on the bubble. With light rain threatening, George Mack bumped Roe out of the field at 2:35 p.m. In doing so, he became the second African American driver (following Willy T. Ribbs) to qualify for the Indy 500.

With some cars practicing and preparing to enter the qualifying line, Team Green withdrew the slow time previously put in by Michael Andretti. The move momentarily reinstated Roe to the field. Andretti's speed greatly improved from the previous weekend, and he safely bumped his way back into the field. With Billy Boat on the bubble, rain ended qualifying early at 4:51 p.m. Jimmy Kite and Donnie Beechler were left waiting in the qualifying line.

Starting grid

Failed to qualify
 #10  Robby McGehee – Waved off
 #15  Oriol Servià   – Waved off
 #16  Jon Herb – Failed to make an attempt during qualifying
 #32   Johnny Herbert   – (Replaced by Memo Gidley, Withdrew)
 #37  John de Vries – (replaced by Scott Harrington)
 #37  Scott Harrington – Waved off
 #81  Billy Roe – Bumped
 #99  Anthony Lazzaro   - (Replaced by Jimmy Kite)
 #99  Jimmy Kite – Stalled during qualifying attempt (Replaced by Mark Dismore)

Carb Day
On Thursday May 23, the final practice session was held. All 33 starters took laps without incident. Later in the afternoon, Penske Racing with driver Hélio Castroneves won the Coors Indy 500 Pit Stop Challenge. They defeated Chip Ganassi Racing and driver Jeff Ward in the final round.

Race running

Start
After a month plagued by constant rain, race day saw clear blue skies and temperatures in the mid 70s (°F). Mari Hulman George gave the command to start engines at 10:52 a.m. EST, and all cars pulled away behind the 50th Anniversary Chevrolet Corvette pace car.

At the start, polesitter Bruno Junqueira took the lead and led the first 32 laps. A record-setting pace early on saw 29 laps completed before the first yellow. Greg Ray brought out the first caution with a crash in turn 1 Junqueira and the rest of the leaders pitted, but he stalled exiting the pits, giving the lead over to rookie Tomas Scheckter.

Mid race
A sequence of pit stops around the 65th lap shuffled the leaderboard. Indy rookie Tony Kanaan took over the lead on lap 70. On lap 78, Sam Hornish Jr. brushed the wall, damaging his suspension. He drove the car to the pits for repairs. Three laps later, while the leaders pitted, fifth place Robby Gordon suffered a large fire and explosion in his pit stall. The explosion blew the top off the pit-side fuel tank. Gordon was uninjured, and the car was able to continue.

On lap 90, with Kanaan still leading, Jimmy Vasser and Bruno Junqueira both slowed with mechanical problems. An oil leak on the track went unnoticed, and leader Kanaan spun in the oil, crashing into turn 3. Rick Treadway also became involved in the incident.

Scheckter resumed the lead after Kanaan dropped out. Meanwhile, Sam Hornish Jr. returned to the track, albeit several laps down.

Second half
With as many as 13 cars on the lead lap, a very long stretch of green flag racing commenced. Two sequences of green-flag pit stops shuffled the lead among Gil de Ferran, Scott Sharp, Felipe Giaffone, and Alex Barron. However, Scheckter still found himself back into the lead by lap 166. With 30 laps to go, Scheckter held an 8.3-second lead over Paul Tracy.

Finish
On lap 173, after leading 85 laps during the race, leader Tomas Scheckter slid high in turn four and crashed against the wall down the frontstretch. Under the yellow, the leaders pitted. Exiting the pits, Gil de Ferran lost a wheel that was not secured, and fell out of contention. Gambling on fuel, Hélio Castroneves stayed out and took over the lead.

On lap 181, the green flag came back out with Castroneves leading, and Felipe Giaffone running second. The lapped car of Dario Franchitti slipped by to get in front of the field. Franchitti's car was painted nearly identical to Tracy's, and caused some confusion/misidentification by announcers. With ten laps to go, Castroneves still led Giaffone, with Paul Tracy charging into third. Castroneves was starting to run low on fuel, and his pace started to slow. Giaffone closed within a half-second.

With less than 3 laps to go, Giaffone dove below Castroneves, attempting to take the lead. The lapped car of Franchitti pulled alongside Castroneves, effectively blocking Giaffone. Castroneves held off the challenge, and third place Paul Tracy managed to move past Giaffone for second. Giaffone later complained that Franchitti was unfairly blocking to help his teammate Tracy. With 2 laps to go, Castroneves led Tracy by only 0.22 seconds at the start/finish line. Down the backstretch, Tracy started to move to the outside, in an attempt to make a pass for the lead. While they were approaching turn 3, a crash occurred on a different part of the track.

The lapped car of rookie Laurent Redon got loose in turn 1, allowing Buddy Lazier (running in 8th place) to dive below him in turn 2. Redon came down on Lazier, the two cars touched, and both crashed hard into the outside wall exiting turn 2. At the same time the crash occurred in turn 2, Tracy and Castroneves were almost side-by-side in turn three. A yellow flag came out for the crash, and Tracy completed the pass. Castroneves backed off the throttle, which allowed Giaffone to pass him, as well as the lapped car of Sam Hornish Jr. Many believed at the time that Castroneves had run out of fuel, or was nearly out of fuel, and thought that was the reason he suddenly had slowed down. Castroneves claims that he saw the yellow light illuminate on his dashboard, and thinking at first it was the fuel light, and he reacted by letting off.

Believing he had just taken the lead with one lap to go, Tracy proclaimed on his two-way radio "Yeah baby!". Barry Green soon responded "there's a problem." Officials in race control, led by Brian Barnhart, stated that Castroneves was the leader.

On the final lap, Tracy, Giaffone, and the lapped car of Hornish, had broken away, and crossed the finish line approximately 19 seconds before the rest of the field. The Corvette pace car, was in turn 4, and was not able to enter the track and pack up the field.  At a slowed pace, and running low on fuel, Castroneves, with the lapped car of Dario Franchitti immediately behind him (in a car painted nearly identical to Tracy's) took the checkered flag as the winner. Tracy and Giaffone completed an additional lap, and were scored by the computer unofficially as second (82.8341 seconds behind) and third (85.6007 second behind) respectively. Their completion of lap 200 was ignored by the scoring system, and their completion of lap 201 was scored for their finish. Castroneves then drove to the frontstretch, jumped out of his car, and climbed the catch fence just as he did a year earlier in 2001.

Despite the concern for fuel, and after running 42 laps since his last pit stop, Castroneves completed his victory lap, and had 1 gallon of fuel remaining in the tank.

Box score

  – Former Indianapolis 500 winner
  – Indianapolis 500 rookie
C – Chassis: D=Dallara, G=G-Force
E – Engine: C=Chevrolet, I=Infiniti
Tires – All cars utilized Firestone tires.

Controversy

Initial confusion

In the immediate aftermath of the race, confusion reigned among the competitors, broadcasters, and fans. Brian Barnhart, in Race Control, made the initial call at the moment, stating "yellow, yellow, yellow, three is your leader" ("three" being Castroneves car number) over the director's radio channel, and such was repeated by his assistant Mel Harder over the teams' race control radio channel. Harder was in charge of activating the yellow lights around the track, and the in-car dashboard yellow light system.

On the television broadcast, commentator Paul Page erroneously stated that Castroneves was the leader because the scoring "reverted back to the previous lap." Such rules are used if electronic transponder-based scoring with multiple timing loops was not used, as in the past, but since the advent of transponder-based scoring, the rule has generally been instead of the last completed lap, but the last timing loop the car crossed at the point of caution. Page also, on at least one occasion, misidentified Dario Franchitti's car as that of Tracy's (the two cars had identical liveries). ABC waited over 14 minutes before they showed a replay of the pass or the crash. However, ABC did air split-screen footage clearly showing the crash occurred before the pass. The footage, however, did not show conclusive evidence of when the yellow light came on. However, TV analyst Scott Goodyear was convinced that Helio won the race, referencing his loss of the 500 in 1995 where he figured out that post-race appeals were rarely accepted.

On the live radio broadcast Mike King announced that "race control said the pass would not count." Donald Davidson echoed the same erroneous information that the scoring reverted to the previous lap (though it was last completed loop prior to caution), and added that the cars did not race back to the yellow, as was the policy in NASCAR at the time (the rule was changed in September 2003, when the practice was banned and scoring reverts to the last scoring loop crossed before the caution was called, except in the final lap or a caution that ends a race because of weather or darkness, when it reverts to video replays).  A similar controversy took place at the 2019 INDYCAR Portland road course event at the start when a massive crash at the opening chicane caused 11 laps of caution as officials could not determine positions based on video evidence.  Officials decided for the 2020 season that scoring reverts to the last loop crossed when a caution occurs. 

In the pits, Barry Green immediately challenged the decision. He told Tracy over the two-way radio that there was "a problem," and later chimed sarcastically that "they (presumably IRL officials) are not going to let one of us (one of the CART teams) win." He contended that Tracy said he had completed the pass before the yellow caution light came on. Tracy said "I feel that I was ahead of him when it went yellow. I passed him, and I saw green. We’re going to protest this thing because I was ahead of him when the yellow came out." 

Meanwhile, Castroneves stated the yellow had come out before the pass was made. "The only reason he passed me, it's because the yellow came on, and I lifted off. I cannot feel sorry for Paul Tracy." Other drivers had different opinion. Eddie Cheever called the finish "confusing." Dario Franchitti, Tracy's teammate, said that "Paul (Tracy) had passed (Castroneves) on the outside before the yellow came out." Mario Andretti, however, spoke with Tracy after the race, and said that Tracy was "more concerned with keeping an eye on Castroneves' car" than watching the yellow lights.

Protest
Official results were posted five hours after the race, with Castroneves declared the winner and Paul Tracy second. As the cars did not cross the finish line in order, the standings were amended so that Tracy's finishing time was scored as a fraction of a second behind that of Castroneves. Team Green immediately filed a protest, and the hearing was scheduled for May 27 at 10:00 a.m. During the two-hour hearing, Brian Barnhart and Indy Racing League officials denied the protest and presented their conclusions. Officials determined that Castroneves was indisputably the leader under the following relevant times:
At the last scoring antenna (entrance of turn 3) before the caution; margin was 0.0371 seconds
At the time of the accident of Redon and Lazier in turn 2
At the time that race official Brian Barnhart made the radio call for a caution
At the time that the dashboard caution lights were activated

In rejecting the protest, Barnhart stated that "Team Green did not present anything that was conclusive enough in any way, shape or form to change our mind."

Appeals hearing
Team Green submitted a written appeal of the protest decision on June 3. A closed-door appeals hearing was scheduled for June 17. Speedway President Tony George presided over the hearing, with Indianapolis attorney Dave Mittingly assisting. Both Team Green and Penske Racing presented evidence, and several persons involved provided testimony. Among those who gave testimony were Tracy, Castroneves, Sam Hornish Jr., Dario Franchitti, Brian Barnhart (race control), Doug Boles (spotter in turn three for Hornish Jr.), and Jeff Horton (IRL Director of Engineering).

The basis of Team Green's argument was that Tracy was the leader when the yellow lights around the track came on, and that those lights should control. While they acknowledged that Castroneves was leading at the time Barnhart called for the yellow, they argued it was irrelevant unless the yellow lights were on. They also did not dispute that it was possible that the dashboard yellow lights on Castroneves' car came on while Castroneves was still leading. They cited the inconsistencies of the dashboard system from car to car, and claimed the dashboard lights had not come on in Tracy's car until after he had made the pass.

Penske Racing's primary defense concentrated on their interpretations of the IRL rulebook. They stated that at the commencement of a yellow caution period, the positioning of the cars is a judgement call made quickly by the officials. They also stated that the ruling of a car passing another car under a caution period is specifically listed as not protestable or appealable under the existing rules.

On July 2, 2002, Tony George issued an 18-page decision on the appeal. He upheld the victory of Hélio Castroneves, and denied Team Green's appeal. In his decision, George stated that "Clearly Helio (Castroneves) was in front when the call (for the yellow) was made" and that several of the caution signals, including trackside and dashboard lights, a radio announcement and a flag closing the pits, were displayed before Tracy's pass. George also accepted Penske's arguments that, even if Tracy was ahead before the caution, the decision to call Castroneves the leader was an unappealable judgment call.

Aftermath
After the decision was rendered, the reaction among fans, media, and competitors was split largely along party lines. CART supporters generally sided with Team Green and Paul Tracy denouncing the decision, while IRL supporters generally accepted the final result. Many Tracy supporters felt the decision was politically motivated, suggesting that Tony George favored Penske Racing (a full-time IRL team) and punished the part-time, rival CART-based effort of Team Green. The controversy was divisive, and worked to reopen wounds from the 1996 open wheel split. Robin Miller openly criticized the decision, and considered Tracy "the unofficial 2002 Indy winner." The day after the race, he presented video footage on RPM 2Night, which he claimed showed evidence the pass was completed under green. Shirts and hats were sold at CART events declaring Tracy the "Real IRL 500 winner", which Tracy would be seen publicly wearing at times.

With Tracy officially relegated to second finishing position, he ultimately failed to break a 91-year-old record that dated back to the first Indianapolis 500 in 1911. Tracy had started 29th, and had he won the race, would have set the record for the lowest starting position by the race winner. It also would have been a post-WWII record for lowest starting position for a winner in any Indy car race. The all-time record was set by Ray Harroun in 1911 (and subsequently tied by Louis Meyer in 1936) by winning the Indianapolis 500 from the 28th starting position. Tracy also missed out on matching the record of fewest laps led by an Indy 500 champion, as he would have led only the final two laps of the race (the previous fewest was in 1912 with only 2 laps led); Dan Wheldon would take the record in 2011 with only one lap led.

Starting with the next IndyCar Series telecast, ABC/ESPN experimented with a new on-screen graphic displaying a yellow banner or yellow symbol the instant a caution period commenced. The system was tied to official race control, and was utilized to avoid confusion about yellow-light conditions, similar to the graphic that had been deployed by Fox, FX, NBC, and TNT for their NASCAR telecasts beginning in 2001.

A few weeks after the decision, Barry Green announced he was selling his share of Team Green to Michael Andretti, and would be taking a sabbatical from the sport. He reportedly had spent over $100,000 on legal expenses. Paul Tracy finished out a mediocre CART season with Green, and left the team at season's end. He won one race, and was voted the 2002 CART Most Popular Driver. During his acceptance speech, he thanked Tony George for helping him win the award, and added that the dispute strengthened his fanbase. "Since that whole disaster, I've become a fan favorite. I guess this is like my Borg-Warner Trophy."

With CART facing financial trouble at season's end, Michael Andretti took the team, then called Andretti Green Racing and now Andretti Autosport, full-time to the IndyCar Series for 2003.  Andretti Autosport has since scored five Indianapolis 500 wins -- 2005, 2007, 2014, 2016, and 2017.  Andretti also is a partner in Bryan Herta Autosport in the 2016 race that team won.

Tracy, angered by the loss, refused to return to the IRL and the Indy 500 in subsequent seasons. On September 23, 2003, when asked if he were interested in driving in the IRL in 2004, he responded "I'm not driving one of those crapwagons." The quote took on a life of its own, and was adopted as a political slogan and battle cry for IRL detractors for years to come. Under the profile section Tracy's official web site (PaulTracy.com) career highlights include "2002 Indy 500 Runner Up (yeah right)." Tracy continued in the Champ Car series, finally winning a season title in 2003, although it came after most of the top teams had already defected to the IRL. He eventually left the series, and had a short stint in the NASCAR Busch Series. In the wake of the 2008 open wheel unification, Tony George himself reportedly offered Tracy a ride  with Vision Racing. Tracy initially declined, musing that "I'm not going to drive for hamburgers and hot dogs." In July 2008, Tracy finally crossed lines and signed with Vision Racing to drive in the Edmonton Indy. He then made a highly publicized return at the 2009 Indianapolis 500, and was previously with NBC Sports as one of the network's INDYCAR broadcasters until he left at the end of the 2021 season.

INDYCAR played off the controversy when Tracy won at the Speedway in 2016 at the Sportscar Vintage Racing Association Brickyard Vintage Racing Invitational Pro-Am, a race featuring amateur drivers paired with Indianapolis Motor Speedway racers, with the headline "Tracy finally gets to drink milk" upon his first career win at the Speedway.

Broadcasting

Radio
The race was carried live on the Indy Racing Radio Network. The network celebrated its 50th anniversary covering the Indianapolis 500. Mike King served as chief announcer. Johnny Rutherford served as "driver expert" for the 13th and final time.

The 2002 race saw all four turn reporters return to their assigned posts from the previous year. Kim Morris and Adam Alexander returned as pit reporters, but Mike Lewis departed and newcomer Jim Murphy took his place.

Guests in the booth included Kurt Ritter (Chevrolet), John F. Fielder (BorgWarner), and pace car driver Jim Caviezel.

Television
The race was carried live flag-to-flag coverage in the United States on ABC Sports. ABC and ESPN had reorganized their broadcasting duties, and eliminated coverage of the CART series. Therefore, Paul Page, who had worked CART races since 1999, was moved back full-time to the IRL and Indy 500. Page was named announcer, while Bob Jenkins was shifted to the "host" position. Recently retired driver Scott Goodyear joined the booth as analyst.

Gone from the broadcast were Al Michaels and Leslie Gudel, but returning was Gary Gerould.

Gallery

Notes

References

Works cited
2002 Indianapolis 500 Daily Trackside Report for the Media
Indianapolis 500 History: Race & All-Time Stats - Official Site
Indy 500 Capsule

Indianapolis 500 races
Indianapolis 500
2002 in IndyCar
Indianapolis 500, 2002
Indianapolis 500
Indianapolis 500
May 2002 sports events in the United States